The Wapous River is a tributary of the Gouin Reservoir, flowing in the territory of the town of La Tuque, in the administrative region of Mauricie, in Quebec, in Canada.

The Wapous River flows in the townships of Lindsay, Berlinguet, and Déziel, almost at the north-eastern limit of the territory of La Tuque and near the boundary of the administrative region of Saguenay-Lac-Saint-Jean. Forestry is the main economic activity of this valley; recreational tourism activities, second.

A forest road branch serves the upper part of this watercourse. This road branch connects with route 212 which bypasses the Gouin Reservoir by the north-east and connects the village of Obedjiwan, Quebec and La Tuque.

The surface of the Wapous River is usually frozen from mid-November to the end of April, however, safe ice circulation is generally from early December to late March.

Geography

Toponymy 
Formerly, this watercourse has been designated "Black Castor River".

The toponym "Wapous River" was formalized on December 5, 1968 at the Commission de toponymie du Québec, when it was created.

Notes and references

See also 

Rivers of Mauricie
Tributaries of the Saint-Maurice River
La Tuque, Quebec